Roy Leonardo Barreras Montealegre (born 27 November 1963) is a Colombian politician and 2018 presidential candidate, currently serving as senator since 2010 and President of the Senate of Colombia since 2022. In addition to senator, Barreras served as chairman of former governing party, the Union Party for the People. He entered politics in 2006 when he was elected as a member of the House of Representatives.

Early life
Roy Barreras was born into a humble family in Cali, Colombia. His grandparents were from Spain, and fled to Colombia during the Spanish Civil War. His mother was from the countryside, her own family displaced during the Colombian conflict, and his father a medical doctor who was forced to travel far from home for extended periods as part of his profession. Barreras struggled during his childhood with bullying from his classmates, working odd jobs including as a taxi driver and an assistant in a bakery. He eventually followed in his father's footsteps and became a medical doctor, working for more than two decades in various parts of Colombia.

Political career
Barreras was elected to congress for the first time in 2006, and has succeeded in each of his re-election campaigns since. In 2011, he was elected to head the congressional Peace Commission, and has been a strong proponent of the Colombian peace process. On 14 June 2017, Senator Barreras officially began his 2018 presidential campaign with a letter to constituents that was published in La Semana.

Barreras was a supporter of former Colombian President Juan Manuel Santos, also of the Partido de la U. Senator Barreras is considered a centrist, and his policy positions reflect his complicated upbringing. His reputation as a politician that is tough on crime has endeared him to conservatives (right wing), including tougher sentences for child abusers and stronger laws against drunk driving. He also has the support of liberals (left wing) for his advocacy for LGBT parenting and the rights of LGBT parents to adopt children in Colombia.

However, it is Senator Barreras' ardent support for Colombian peace process and Colombian President Juan Manuel Santos that have been his defining attributes as both a senator and presidential candidate. Barreras has accused those who oppose the peace process of being populists whose rhetoric could do lasting damage to peace in the country. Barreras lost in the first round of the 2018 presidential elections that eventually saw Ivan Duque of the Centro Democratico party elected to the presidency.

References

|-

1963 births
Living people
People from Cali
Members of the Senate of Colombia
University of Valle alumni
National University of Colombia alumni
Colombian taxi drivers
Colombian people of Spanish descent
Social Party of National Unity politicians
Presidents of the Senate of Colombia